AminIB, also known as Amin Investment Bank (Shirkat-e Tamin-e Sirmaih-e Amin), is a major Iranian banking establishment offering commercial and investment banking services. The company was established in 2007 as part of the government's economic reform of the banking system.

The bank specializes in services relating to Iran's petrochemical industry and mining sectors, representing the interests of the Abadan Refinery, and IMIDRO.

In 2007, the bank had initial equity capital of $100 million.

Operations
In addition to offering short and fixed deposit accounts for domestic and overseas clients, the bank also provides mergers and acquisitions services, risk management, financing and corporate loans.

Corporate governance
 salman khandemalmele - CEO

Current members of the board of directors include: Mahmoud Bahmani, Masoud Gharaati, Reza Raei, Mehdi Ghadami, Ali Asgari, Saeed Khoda Moradi, Mohammad Reza Rostami.

See also

Banking in Iran
Privatization in Iran
Tehran Stock Exchange

References

External links

Banks of Iran
Banks established in 2007
Investment banks
Companies based in Tehran
Iranian companies established in 2007